Paolo Sylos Labini (30 October 1920 – 7 December 2005) was an Italian economist and a key figure in the economic debate in post-World War II Italy. He was a professor of political economy at Sapienza University of Rome and an active member of Accademia Nazionale dei Lincei.

Early life and education

After secondary school, Sylos Labini enrolled in the Faculty of Law at the Sapienza University of Rome, graduating in July 1942 with a thesis on the economic consequences of innovations. In his research, he turned to study classical economists—in particular Adam Smith, David Ricardo, and Karl Marx—after becoming aware of the limited interest in innovations among contemporary economists. At the time, his mentor was Alberto Breglia (1900–1955), a professor of political economy at Sapienza University since 1942.

After graduating with a cum laude distinction in law in July 1942, Sylos Labini was appointed as a voluntary assistant. He was later appointed as the assistant professor of political economy at the Faculty of Economics of Sapienza University. Labini's relationship with Breglia left him with the concept of economy as a way to understand history. Breglia encouraged Labini to travel to the United States to complete his studies, and Sylos Labini was among the first young people after World War II to study abroad. Labini ventured overseas in the hope of deepening his economic knowledge and to better understand the peculiarities of the Italian economic status.

In 1948, Sylos Labini first went to Chicago, where he met Franco Modigliani, and then to Cambridge, Massachusetts, to study with Joseph Schumpeter at Harvard University. At Harvard, he met Gaetano Salvemini and John Kenneth Galbraith. He also studied for a time in Cambridge, where he was supervised by Dennis Robertson, and became friends with Piero Sraffa, Nicholas Kaldor, Joan Robinson.

Career

Sylos Labini qualified as a lecturer in political economy in 1953, then taught at different universities. In 1955, he became an assistant professor of political economy at the Faculty of Economics of the University of Sassari. In February 1958, he was appointed professor of economic and financial policy at the Faculty of Law. The following year, he taught political economy at the Faculty of Economics of the University of Catania. Sylos Labini moved to the University of Bologna, before returning to Sapienza University in October 1962, where he taught principles of political economy at the Faculty of Statistical, Demographic, and Actuarial Sciences until his retirement in 1995. He was appointed emeritus professor in 1997.

Contributions to economic theory

Sylos Labini's main contribution came in 1956, with Oligopolio e Progresso tecnico (English edition, Oligopoly and Technical Progress, 1962). The book was published around the same time as Joe Bain's Barriers to New Competition (1956). The two works were grouped together in an article by Franco Modigliani (1958), which caused them to become accepted as part of mainstream theory on non-competitive market forms.

Sylos Labini attached great importance to the dynamic aspects of his analysis. For over sixty years, from his dissertation onwards, the theme of technical progress has been a constant presence in his work: like Smith, Labini considered it as the main element for economic development (Smith's Wealth of Nations), as a precondition, though not automatic, for civil development of society. Alongside this, the other central theme was that (Ricardian, but also present in Smith) of the distribution of income, and more generally of the living conditions of the various strata of society. This line of research was developed in Sindacati, inflazione e produttività (1972); English edition, Trade Unions, Inflation and Productivity, 1974. Wages and prices are not determined in fully competitive markets. These themes reappear in many subsequent contributions; an idea of the width and depth of Labini's analysis is provided by The Forces of Economic Growth and Decline (1984), which remains the major reference point for studying his economic thought.

Like Smith, Sylos Labini argues that economic development can foster civil development in society, while the latter is in turn a fundamental condition for sustainable economic development.

The econometric model of the Italian economy 

Between 1966 and 1967, Sylos Labini worked on developing an econometric model of the Italian economy. His model was the first systematic econometric research on the Italian economy, and was aimed to reconcile theoretical analysis with historical changes while being gradually modified with new variables. The econometric studies intertwined with the analysis of major Italian problems of economic policy. Between 1965 and 1975, Sylos Labini published a series of works on wages, productivity, and inflation, which incorporated the results of his econometric analysis.

Economics and politics

According to Sylos Labini, an economist is necessarily influenced by personal judgment, which determines, at a minimum, the choice of problems studied and which may also skew the outcome of the analysis.

In his last book, Ahi serva Italia (2006), Sylos Labini spoke as a civic-minded economist to Italians who refuse to understand that respect for rules is an absolute requirement of a market economy. He argued that capitalism cannot function without a widespread moral sentiment that condemns the breach of rules.

On this subject, Sylos Labini referred to an excerpt from Gaetano Salvemini:

Selected bibliography

  Oligopolio e progresso tecnico. Milano, Giuffré 1956. Second edition 1957; following editions (3rd – 6th) Torino, Einaudi, 1964, 1967, 1972 e 1975 English edition: Oligopoly and Technical Progress, Cambridge (Mass.), Harvard University Press, 1st edition 1962, 2nd ed. 1969. Several translations:in Polish 1963, in Japanese 1st ed. 1964, 2nd ed. 1970; in Spanish 1966, in Czech 1967, in Portuguese 1980.
  Economie capitalistiche ed economie pianificate. Bari, Laterza, 1960.
  Problemi dell'economia siciliana. Milano, Feltrinelli, 1966.
  Problemi dello sviluppo economico. Bari, Laterza, 1970.
  Sindacati, inflazione e produttività. Roma-Bari, Laterza, 1972.
  Saggio sulle classi sociali. Roma-Bari, Edizione Laterza, 1974. 
  Lezioni di Economia, Volume I: Questioni preliminari, La macroeconomia e la teoria Keynesiana. Roma, Edizioni dell'Ateneo, 1979.
  Lezioni di Economia, Volume II: microeconomia. Roma, Edizioni dell'Ateneo,  1982.
  Il sottosviluppo e l'economia contemporanea. Roma-Bari, Laterza 1983.
  Le forze dello sviluppo e del declino. Roma-Bari, Laterza, 1984. (English translation: Forces of Economic Growth and Decline, Cambridge (Mass.), MIT Press 1984). 
  Le classi sociali negli anni '80 Roma-Bari, Laterza, 1986. 
  Nuove tecnologie e disoccupazione. Roma-Bari, Laterza, 1989. 
  Elementi di dinamica economica. Roma-Bari, Laterza, 1992. 
  Progresso tecnico e sviluppo ciclico. Roma-Bari, Laterza, 1993. 
  Carlo Marx: è tempo di un bilancio (a cura di). Roma-Bari, Laterza, 1994. 
  Il pensiero economico: Temi e protagonisti. Roma-Bari, Laterza, 1995. (with Alessandro Roncaglia). 
  La Crisi Italiana. Roma-Bari, Laterza, 1995.
  Sottosviluppo - una strategia di riforme. Roma-Bari, Laterza, 2001. English translation: Underdevelopment A Strategy for Reform. Cambridge, CUP, 2001).
  Un paese a civiltà limitata. Roma-Bari, Laterza, 2001. 
  Berlusconi e gli anticorpi. Roma-Bari, Laterza, 2003. 
  Torniamo ai classici. Roma-Bari, Laterza, 2004. 
  Ahi serva Italia: un appello ai miei concittadini. Roma-Bari, Laterza, 2006.

For the full bibliography of Paolo Sylos Labini see Di Falco, E. and Sanfilippo, E. (2007). Una bibliografia degli scritti di Paolo Sylos Labini, Economia & Lavoro, 41 (3): 79-109.

A large number of Labini's publications are collected in a digital fund. The University of Tuscia hosts the fund on its Open Archive in agreement with Labini's heirs and the Paolo Sylos Labini Association. Acquisition and digitization of the materials began in 2007 thanks to funding from the Ministry of University and Research and the support of the Sapienza University of Rome. The archiving work has been coordinated by Professors Marcella Corsi and Alessandro Roncaglia.

References

Citations
Wikiquote for citations about or of Paolo Sylos Labini.

External links
 Wikimedia Commons
 Paolo Sylos Labini, su Treccani.it – Enciclopedie on line, Istituto dell'Enciclopedia Italiana.
 Paolo Sylos Labini, in Enciclopedia Italiana, Istituto dell'Enciclopedia Italiana.
 Paolo Sylos Labini, in Dizionario biografico degli italiani, Istituto dell'Enciclopedia Italiana.
 Opere di Paolo Sylos Labini, su Liber Liber.
 Opere di Paolo Sylos Labini, su openMLOL, Horizons Unlimited srl.
 (EN) Opere di Paolo Sylos Labini, su Open Library, Internet Archive.
 (FR) Pubblicazioni di Paolo Sylos Labini, su Persée, Ministère de l'Enseignement supérieur, de la Recherche et de l'Innovation.
 Registrazioni di Paolo Sylos Labini, su RadioRadicale.it, Radio Radicale.
 Web site of the Paolo Sylos Labini Association.
 Corsi, M. (2006), In memory of Paolo Sylos Labini (1920 – 2005), The European Journal of the History of Economic Thought, Volume 13 - Issue 4

1920 births
2005 deaths
Italian economists